Statistics of UAE Football League for the 2003–04 season.

Overview
It was contested by 12 teams, and Al Ain FC won the championship.

Group stage

Group A

Group B

Playoff

References
United Arab Emirates - List of final tables (RSSSF)

UAE Pro League seasons
United
1